Pinus echinata, the shortleaf pine, is a species of pine native to the southeastern United States.

Description
The tree is variable in form, sometimes straight, sometimes crooked, with an irregular crown.

They open at maturity but are persistent. Shortleaf pine seedlings develop a persistent J-shaped crook near the ground surface. Axillary and other buds form near the crook and initiate growth if the upper stem is killed by fire or is severed.

This feature can be used to distinguish P. echinata from all other Pinus species within its native range.

Taxonomy 
The Latin specific epithet of echinata refers to hedgehog, from echinus.

Distribution and habitat 
Shortleaf pine has the largest range of the southern US yellow pines. It is found from southernmost New York, south to northern Florida, west to eastern Texas and Oklahoma. 

This pine occupies a variety of habitats from rocky uplands to wet flood plains.

Ecology 
With frequent fire, the species creates a savanna, with a very diverse understory and prime habitat for the red-cockaded woodpecker.

The tree frequently hybridizes naturally with loblolly pine and pitch pine where their ranges intersect. Hybridization with loblolly pine has become increasingly frequent in recent decades and results in a loss of fire tolerance.

Uses 
This pine is a source of wood pulp, plywood veneer, and lumber for a variety of uses. The shortleaf pine is one of the southern US "southern yellow pines"; it is also occasionally called southern yellow pine or the shortstraw pine.

References

External links 

Gymnosperm Database: Pinus echinata
NCRS: USDA Plants Profile: Pinus echinata

echinata
Trees of the Eastern United States
Flora of the Appalachian Mountains
Trees of the Southeastern United States
Trees of the South-Central United States
Trees of the Southern United States
Trees of the North-Central United States
Trees of the Northeastern United States
Least concern plants
Taxa named by Philip Miller
Trees of North America
Trees of the United States